A docking compartment is a module of a space station to which visiting spacecraft can dock. Docking Compartment may refer to:
 Docking Compartment 1 (Pirs)
 Docking Compartment 2 (Poisk)

See also 
 Mini-Research Modules
 Mir Docking Module

Components of the International Space Station